Sebastian Daniel "Sibby" Sisti (July 26, 1920 – April 24, 2006) was an American Major League Baseball utility player.

Playing career
Sisti stood 5' 11" (180 cm) tall and weighed 175 pounds (79 kg). His perseverance in the face of numerous injuries made him a fan favorite. Known for his versatility, Sisti played every position except pitcher and catcher during his major league career.

At the age of 18, Sisti made his Major League Baseball debut with the Boston Bees on July 21, 1939, just five days before he turned 19, then remained with the club (later known as the Boston Braves) through 1942, after the beginning of World War II. He served in the United States Coast Guard from 1943 to 1945.

After returning from the war, where the Braves had no place for him in their lineup, he spent most of 1946 with the Indianapolis Indians of the American Association, hitting .343 for that club and winning The Sporting News Minor League Player of the Year Award. The following year, he returned to the Braves.

In 1948, Sisti played a key role in the club's run to the World Series, filling in for injured second baseman Eddie Stanky for part of the season. He remained with the team when they became the Milwaukee Braves in 1953, and retired from playing in 1954 to join their coaching staff.

After retirement
After leaving the Braves, Sisti coached and managed in the minors for many years and coached for the expansion Seattle Pilots in 1969.

The last page of The Great American Baseball Card Flipping, Trading and Bubble Gum Book (by Brendan C. Boyd & Fred C. Harris, Little Brown & Co, 1973) had a card of Sisti in his Braves uniform catching a ball, with the authors' caption, "Goodnight, Sibby Sisti, wherever you are."

He answered that implied question by appearing in a small role in the 1984 film The Natural (which was filmed in Buffalo), portraying the Pittsburgh manager. He was also a consultant on the film, ensuring that it captured the feel of 1930s baseball.

On April 24, 2006, Sisti died at the age of 85 in Amherst, New York. He was interred in the Mount Calvary Cemetery in Cheektowaga, New York.

Sisti was a first cousin of Dan Carnevale, a minor league manager who made the majors in 1970 with the Kansas City Royals as a first base coach.

See also
List of Major League Baseball players who spent their entire career with one franchise

References

External links

His biography at the Buffalo Sports Hall of Fame
Sibby Sisti - Baseballbiography.com
Baseball-Almanac.com

TheDeadBallEra.com – obituary by Brad Bisbing
Retrosheet.org

1920 births
2006 deaths
Austin Senators players
Baseball players from Buffalo, New York
Boston Bees players
Boston Braves players
Corpus Christi Clippers players
Hartford Bees players
Hartford Laurels players
Indianapolis Indians players
Jacksonville Braves players
Major League Baseball coaches
Major League Baseball second basemen
Major League Baseball shortstops
Major League Baseball third basemen
Milwaukee Braves coaches
Milwaukee Braves players
Quebec Braves players
Sacramento Solons managers
United States Coast Guard personnel of World War II